CT2 is a cordless telephony standard, also known by the marketing name "Telepoint". 

CT2, CT-2, CT 2 and similar may also refer to:

 ČT2 – a television channel in the Czech Republic
 CT2 (MBTA bus) – a cross-town bus route operated by the MBTA in the Boston, Massachusetts area
 Casino Tycoon 2 – the second film in the Casino Tycoon series
 Connecticut's 2nd congressional district 
 Connecticut Route 2 – a state route in Connecticut, USA
 Crazy Taxi 2 – the second game in the Crazy Taxi series